The 2009 Gagarin Cup Final was a best-of-seven playoff series that determined the Kontinental Hockey League (KHL) champion for the 2008–09 season. As a culmination of the 2009 Gagarin Cup playoffs, Ak Bars Kazan defeated Lokomotiv Yaroslavl, four games to three, and were awarded the Gagarin Cup.

The series

Game one

Game two

Game three

Game four

Game five

Game six

Game seven

Gagarin Cup Finals
Gagarin Cup